is a 1980 Japanese pink film directed by Banmei Takahashi.

Synopsis
An older yakuza man falls in love with Seru, a high school girl. When he is put in prison, Seru begins working as a prostitute to earn money for the gangster's parole. During her yakuza lover's incarceration, Seru gains a new, young boyfriend. The yakuza discovers the new boyfriend after he is released from prison. Realizing that she will have a better life with her new boyfriend who is not associated with the yakuza, he sacrifices his love for Seru and gives her up.

Cast
 Cecile Gōda (豪田路世留) as Seru
 Satoshi Miyata (宮田諭) as Seru's younger boyfriend
 Shirō Shimomoto (下元史郎) as yakuza in love with Seru
 Naomi Oka (丘なおみ)
 Maria Satsuki (五月マリア)
 Ren Ōsugi (大杉漣)

Background and critical appraisal
Along with Mamoru Watanabe and Genji Nakamura, Banmei Takahashi was known as one of the "Three Pillars of Pink" before he made Girl Mistress. He was known for his stylistically unique approach to the genre which brought college students back to pink film theaters at this time, when Nikkatsu's Roman Porno series was beginning to lose its popularity among this audience.

In their Japanese Cinema Encyclopedia: The Sex Films, Thomas and Yuko Mihara Weisser give Girl Mistress three-and-a-half out of four stars. Director Takahashi had already made a name for himself in the pink film through his films at Kōji Wakamatsu's production company, such as Raping the Sisters (1977) and Japanese Inquisition (1978), and films made at his own company, such as Attacking Girls and Scandal: Pleasure Trap (both 1979). However, according to the Weissers, Girl Mistress is the film which cemented his name in the history of pink cinema.

Availability
Banmei Takahashi filmed Girl Mistress for his own Takahashi Productions and Kokuei and it was released theatrically in Japan by Shintōhō Eiga in October 1980. Uplink released it on DVD as part of their Nippon Erotics series on June 28, 2002.

Bibliography

English

Japanese

References

1980 films
Films directed by Banmei Takahashi
1980s Japanese-language films
Pink films
Shintōhō Eiga films
1980s Japanese films